Oued Zenati is a district in Guelma Province, Algeria. It was named after its capital, Oued Zenati, the second most populated municipality in the province.

Municipalities
The district is further divided into 3 municipalities:
Oued Zenati
Bordj Sabat
Aïn Reggada

References

 
Districts of Guelma Province